Signy-l'Abbaye is a commune in the department of Ardennes, in the north-eastern French region of Grand Est.

Geography
The river Vaux, a small tributary of the Aisne, flows through the commune.

Population

See also
Communes of the Ardennes department

References

Communes of Ardennes (department)
Ardennes communes articles needing translation from French Wikipedia